Arthur C Kirsch (born 1932) is a literary critic noted for his scholarly writings on Shakespeare, Dryden, and W. H. Auden. He taught for many years at the University of Virginia, where he is now professor emeritus.

Books:

 Jacobean Dramatic Perspectives, 1972
 Dryden's Heroic Drama, 1972
 The Passions of Shakespeare's Tragic Heroes, 1990
 Shakespeare and the Experience of Love, 1991
 W. H. Auden, Lectures on Shakespeare (editor), 2002
 W. H. Auden, The Sea and the Mirror: A Commentary on Shakespeare' "The Tempest" (editor), 2005
 Auden and Christianity, 2005

References

1932 births
Living people
University of Virginia faculty
American literary critics